Quảng Ngãi station is one of the main railway stations on the North–South railway (Reunification Express) in Vietnam. It serves the city of Quảng Ngãi, lying 1.5 kilometres west of the main centre.

References

Railway stations in Vietnam
Buildings and structures in Quảng Ngãi province